This is a list of schools in the City of Salford in the English county of Greater Manchester.

State-funded schools

Primary schools

Barton Moss Community Primary School, Barton
Beech Street Community Primary School, Winton
Boothstown Methodist Primary School, Boothstown
Brentnall Primary School, Higher Broughton
Bridgewater Primary School, Little Hulton
Broadoak Primary School, Swinton
Broughton Jewish Cassell Fox Primary School, Broughton
Cadishead Primary School, Cadishead
The Cathedral School of St Peter & St John RC, Salford
Christ Church CE Primary School, Patricroft
Christ The King RC Primary School, Walkden
Clarendon Road Community Primary School, Eccles
Clifton Primary School, Clifton
The Deans Primary School, Swinton
Dukesgate Academy, Little Hulton
Ellenbrook Community Primary School, Ellenbrook, Worsley
Fiddlers Lane Community Primary School, Irlam
The Friars Primary School, Salford
Godfrey Ermen Memorial CE Primary School, Barton
Grosvenor Road Primary School, Swinton
Hilton Lane Primary School, Little Hulton
Holy Cross and All Saints' RC Primary School, Barton
Holy Family RC Primary School, Salford
Irlam Endowed Primary School, Irlam
Irlam Primary School, Irlam
James Brindley Community Primary School, Walkden
Lark Hill Community Primary School, Salford
Lewis Street Primary School, Patricroft
Light Oaks Infant School, Pendleton
Light Oaks Junior School, Pendleton
Lower Kersal Community Primary School, Lower Kersal
Marlborough Road Academy, Higher Broughton
Mesne Lea Primary School, Walkden
Monton Green Primary School, Monton, Eccles
Moorfield Community Primary School, Irlam
Moorside Primary School, Swinton
Mossfield Primary School, Newtown, Pendlebury
North Walkden Primary School, Walkden
Our Lady and Lancashire Martyrs' RC Primary School, Worsley
Peel Hall Primary School, Little Hulton
Primrose Hill Primary School, Ordsall
River View Primary School, Salford
St Andrew's CE Primary School, Boothstown
St Andrew's CE Primary School, Eccles
St Andrew's Methodist Primary School, Little Hulton
St Augustine's CE Primary School, Pendlebury
St Boniface's RC Primary School, Higher Broughton
St Charles' RC Primary School, Moorside, Swinton
St Edmund's RC Primary School, Little Hulton
St George's CE Primary School, Charlestown, Pendleton
St Gilbert's RC Primary School, Winton
St John's CE Primary School, Pendlebury
St Joseph The Worker RC Primary School, Irlam
St Joseph's RC Primary School, Ordsall
St Luke's RC Primary School, Irlams o' th' Height
St Luke's RC Primary School, Salford
St Mark's RC Primary School, Clifton
St Mark's CE Primary School, Walkden
St Mary's CE Primary School, Cadishead
St Mary's RC Primary School, Eccles
St Mary's RC Primary School, Swinton
St Paul's CE Primary School, Kersal
St Paul's CE Primary School, Salford
St Paul's CE Primary School, Walkden
St Paul's CE Primary School, Walkden
St Paul's Peel CE Primary School, Little Hulton
St Peter's CE Primary School, Swinton
St Phillip's CE Primary School, Salford
St Phillip's RC Primary School, Higher Broughton
St Sebastian's RC Primary School, Charlestown, Pendleton
St Teresa's RC Primary School, Irlam
St Thomas of Canterbury RC Primary School, Higher Broughton
Summerville Primary School, Irlams o' th' Height
Wardley CE Primary School, Wardley, Swinton
Westwood Park Community Primary School, Winton
Wharton Primary School, Little Hulton
Willow Tree Primary School, Salford

Secondary schools

The Albion Academy, Pendleton
Aldridge UTC@MediaCityUK, Salford Quays
All Hallows RC High School, Weaste
Beis Yaakov High School, Higher Broughton
Buile Hill Academy, Pendleton
Co-op Academy Swinton, Pendlebury
Co-op Academy Walkden, Walkden
Ellesmere Park High School, Ellesmere Park
Irlam and Cadishead Academy, Irlam
The Lowry Academy, Walkden
Moorside High School, Swinton
Oasis Academy MediaCityUK, Salford Quays
St Ambrose Barlow RC High School, Wardley
St Patrick's RC High School, Peel Green
Salford City Academy, Peel Green

Special and alternative schools

Alder Brook, Winton
The Canterbury Centre, Eccles
The Clifton Centre, Clifton
Chatsworth High School, Ellesmere Park
The New Broadwalk PRU, Salford
New Park Academy, Patricroft
Oakwood Academy, Ellesmere Park
Springwood Primary School, Swinton

Further education
Salford City College

Independent schools

Primary and preparatory schools

Ateres Elisheva, Broughton
Beis Rochel Mcr Girls' School, Higher Broughton
Bnos Margulis Viznitz Girls' School, Higher Broughton
Branwood Preparatory School, Monton, Eccles
Clarendon Cottage School, Eccles
Kerem Shloime, Salford
Manchester Jewish Community High School, Salford
Manchester Junior Girls' School, Salford
Talmud Torah Chinuch Norim School, Higher Broughton
Talmud Torah Yetev Lev, Salford
Tashbar of Manchester, Broughton Park
Toras Emes, Salford
Toras Moshe, Salford

Senior and all-through schools

Ahavas Torah Boys Academy, Pendleton
Beis Hatalmud School, Broughton
Beis Malka Girls School, Higher Broughton
Beis Ruchel Girls School, Broughton
Bnos Yisroel School, Higher Broughton
Bridgewater School, Worsley
Manchester Senior Girls School, Salford
Mechinoh School, Broughton
Oholei Yosef Yitzchok Lubavitch Schools, Broughton Park
OYY Lubavitch Boys School, Broughton Park
Tiferes, Broughton

Special and alternative schools
Aim Habonim, Higher Broughton
Edstart, Charlestown, Pendleton

References

 Salford City Council School and College Finder
 Ofsted (Office for Standards in Education)

 
Salford